Chlosyne whitneyi, the rockslide checkerspot or Sierra Nevada checkerspot, is a butterfly of the family Nymphalidae. It is found in western North America from British Columbia and Alberta south, in the mountains, to California and Colorado.

Description
The wingspan is 32–41 mm. Adults are on wing from July to August in one generation per year. Its habitats include alpine rockslides and scree slopes.

The larvae feed on various species in the sunflower family including Erigeron and Solidago species. They feed gregariously on the leaves and flowers of their host plant.

Third- and fourth-instar larvae hibernate under rocks.

Subspecies
Chlosyne whitneyi damoetas (Skinner, 1902)
Chlosyne whitneyi whitneyi

References

External links

whitneyi
Butterflies of North America
Taxa named by Hans Hermann Behr
Butterflies described in 1863